Başqışlaq is a village in the Goranboy District of Azerbaijan. The village forms part of the municipality of Buzluq.

References

External links 

Populated places in Goranboy District